The JAC Refine M3 is a compact MPV produced by JAC Motors.

Overview

The Refine M3 compact MPV was introduced as a near-production concept during the 2014 Beijing Auto Show. 

The production version was revealed in 2015 positioning above the Refine M2 compact MPV with prices ranging from 69,800 yuan to 74,800 yuan. At launch, the Refine M3 is powered by a 1.6-liter petrol inline-four engine with 120hp and 150nm mated to a five-speed manual gearbox. A 2.0-liter petrol engine producing 143hp and 180nm was added to the line-up later in 2015. The Refine M3 is controversial when it comes to styling as it heavily resembles the Nissan NV200 from the side profile. A face-lift version was launched later updating the front fascia to be in line with the rest of the Refine MPV products.

Refine M3L
JAC Motors officially released the Refine M3L at the 2019 Chengdu Auto Show. The Refine M3L is a long-wheelbase version of the regular Refine M3. The wheelbase of the Refine M3L is 300mm longer than the standard version Refine M3 while the rear overhand and width was also enlarged making up to a final length of 5075mm to 5145mm, a width of 1765mm, and a wheelbase of 3110mm. The interior space of the Refine M3L is more versatile and support 9-seat layout. Based on market positioning and customer needs, the Refine M3L will continue to launch IKEA, Commercial, and Logistics versions for different target markets. Power of the Refine M3L comes from a LJ4A18Q6 1.8-liter naturally aspirated engine producing 133 ps and a peak torque of 182 Nm. Additionally, the M3L also offers ABS plus EBD, airbags, tire pressure monitoring and warning, and optional body stability systems.

See also
Chinese-made NV200 clones

 Gonow Xinglang - First Chinese-made NV200 clone in 2013.
 BYD M3 DM - Third Chinese-made NV200 clone in 2014.

Original Japanese-made van
 Nissan NV200

References

External links 
Official site - In Chinese

M3
Vans
Mini MPVs
Minivans
Front-wheel-drive vehicles
2010s cars
Cars introduced in 2015